Crandon Park is an  urban park in metropolitan Miami, occupying the northern part of Key Biscayne. It is connected to mainland Miami via the Rickenbacker Causeway.

History

The land Crandon Park occupies was once part of the largest coconut plantation in the United States, operated by William John Matheson and his heirs. In 1940 the Matheson family donated  of their land to Dade County (now Miami-Dade County) for a public park. In return, county commissioner Charles H. Crandon promised that the county would build a causeway to Key Biscayne. World War II delayed construction, but the causeway opened in 1947.

At one time Crandon Park also included a zoo, occupying  of the park. The first animals in the zoo, including some lions, an elephant and a rhinoceros, had been stranded when a circus went out of business in Miami. Some Galapagos tortoises, monkeys and pheasants were added from the Matheson plantation. Other animals were added, including a white Bengal tiger. In 1981 the Crandon Park Zoo was moved from the park to a location south of Miami, and became the Miami MetroZoo, later renamed the Miami-Dade Zoological Park and Gardens.

Facilities
Crandon Boulevard extends from the end of the Rickenbacker Causeway through the length of the park, providing access to the Village of Key Biscayne and Bill Baggs Cape Florida State Park.

The park has a variety of facilities, including a marina, a golf course, the Tennis Center at Crandon Park, a family amusement center, picnic shelters and a nature center. There is parking for more than 3,000 vehicles in the park. Part of the park is set aside as the Bear Cut Preserve, a designated natural Environment Study Area. Guided tours through the preserve are available.

Marjory Stoneman Douglas Biscayne Nature Center
The Marjory Stoneman Douglas Biscayne Nature Center, also known as Biscayne Nature Center, is located at the north end of Crandon Park.  Features include natural history exhibits, demonstration lab classroom facilities, an audio visual presentation room and a gift shop.  The center is a project of Miami-Dade County Public Schools, Miami-Dade County Parks and Recreation Department and the not-for-profit community support group.

Gallery

References
Notes

Bibliography

Blank, Joan Gill. 1996. Key Biscayne. Sarasota, Florida: Pineapple Press, Inc. .
Crandon, Charles H. (no date, circa 1976). Country Bumpkin. Miami: Johnson Press.

External links
 Crandon Park - official site
 Marjory Stoneman Douglas Biscayne Nature Center - official site

 

Key Biscayne, Florida
Parks in Miami-Dade County, Florida
Beaches of Miami-Dade County, Florida
Nature centers in Florida
Beaches of Florida